Hans Kremer (born 19 March 1954) is a German actor. He appeared in more than fifty films since 1984.

Filmography

References

External links 

1954 births
Living people
German male film actors